Ratziti Sheteda (I wanted you to know) is a famous Israeli song written and composed by Uzi Hitman. The song is also widely known as "Elohim Sheli" or "My God".

The song was written in 1979 and included in Hitman's second album I was born to the Peace, album dedicated to his son for hopes of peace at the time.

The song depicts a dream that the narrator has had and in the dream an angel/sailor appears with a message of peace to the children of the world. The narrator then wakes up, is reminded of the dream but does not find the peace that the angel has promised him. Thus, the song is a plea to God to make the dream come true.

In 2003, the hip-hop group Hadag Nahash made their own version of the song with additional lyrics.

Part of the Song:

My God, I wanted you to know
A dream I dreamt last night in bed
And in the dream I saw an angel
From the heavens he came to me and said thus:
I have come from the heavens, I have traveled far,
To deliver a Blessing of Peace to all children
To deliver a Blessing of Peace to all children

And when I woke up I remembered the dream
And I went to look for Peace
And there was no angel and there was no peace
He was long gone and I was left with the dream

My God, I wanted you to know
A dream I dreamt last night in bed
And in the dream I saw a sailor
From the depths of the sea he rose and told me thus:
I came from the water, from the depths of the sea
To deliver a Blessing of Peace to the children of the world,
To deliver a Blessing of Peace to the children of the world,

And when I woke up I remembered the dream
And I went to look for Peace
And there was no angel and there was no peace
He took the blessing, and I still have that dream.

See also
 List of anti-war songs

External links
Lyrics of Uzi Hitman 
Video/Lyrics of Uzi Hitman/Hadag Nahash 
Youtube video - Uzi Hitman 
Youtube video - Hadag Nahash 

Hebrew-language songs
Hebrew-language children's songs
Israeli songs
Anti-war songs